The following is a list of films originally produced and/or distributed theatrically by Paramount Pictures and released in the 1960s.

References

External links
 Paramount Pictures Complete Library

 1960–1969
American films by studio
1960s in American cinema
Lists of 1960s films